Rhopalophora venezuelensis is a species of beetle in the family Cerambycidae. It was described by Louis Alexandre Auguste Chevrolat in 1859.

References

External links

 

venezuelensis
Beetles described in 1859
Taxa named by Louis Alexandre Auguste Chevrolat